Turning Dragon is the fourth studio album by electronic musician Chris Clark and the second one under the moniker Clark. It was released on 28 January 2008 by Warp.

Track listing

References

2008 albums
Clark (musician) albums
Warp (record label) albums